Salvin is a surname. Notable people with the surname include:
 Anthony Salvin (1799–1881), English architect
 Anthony Salvin (academic), Master of University College, Oxford (1557–58)
 Francis Henry Salvin (1817–1904), English hunter and writer
 Osbert Salvin FRS (1835–1898), English naturalist, best known for co-authoring Biologia Centrali-Americana (1879–1915)
 Richard Salvin, Master of University College, Oxford (1547–51)

See also
 Carnosic acid, a natural chemical compound found in rosemary
 Thorpe Salvin, village and a civil parish in South Yorkshire, England
 Salvin's albatross
 Salvin's anetia
 Salvin's big-eyed bat
 Salvin's cichlid
 Salvin's curassow
 Salvin's spiny pocket mouse